Cirrhitoidea is a superfamily within the suborder Percoidei of the large order of ray-finned fishes, the Perciformes.

Systematics
The Cirrhitoidera has been considered to be a superfamily within the large order Perciformes, within the suborder Percoidei. Molecular studies have also placed the superfamily within the order Centrarchiformes, although the Cirrhitoidea is confirmed as a monophyletic clade.  The 5th Edition of Fishes of the World does not recognise Centrarchiformes and retains the superfamily within the order Perciformes.

In his 1995 arrangement of the relationship between the families within the Cirrhitoidea Greenwood demonstrated that the Cirrhitidae was likely to be the most basal group, with the Chironemidae as the next most pleisomorphic family, with the remaining three families, Aplodactylidae, Cheilodactylidae, and Latridae having unresolved relationships within the group. A molecular study of 2004 suggested that the Latridae should be expanded to include some species from the Cheilodactylidae, and the 5th edition of Fishes of the World suggests that more studies should be undertaken to resolve the phylogeny of all of the taxa included in the Cirrhitoidea.

Families
The following families are classified within the superfamily Cirrhitoidea:

 Cirrhitidae Macleay, 1841 (Hawkfishes)
 Chironemidae Gill, 1862 (Kelpfishes)
 Aplodactylidae Günther, 1859 (Marblefishes)
 Cheilodactylidae Bonaparte, 1850 (Morwongs)
 Latridae Gill, 1862 (Trumpeters)

Characteristics
The Cirrhitoidea are characterised by having the pelvics fins placed relatively far to the posterior of the pectoral fins, The most ventral 5–8 rays of the pectorals are simple and unbranched, typically thickened and sometimes separate from each other. The anal fin normally has 3 spines.

References

Percoidei